Cyclotyphlops deharvengi, or Deharveng’s blind snake, is a species of blind snake placed in the  monotypic genus Cyclotyphlops. It is found in southeastern Sulawesi, Indonesia. No subspecies are currently recognized.

Etymology
The specific name, deharvengi, is in honor of Louis Deharveng, who is an entomologist at the Muséum national d'histoire naturelle, Paris.

Geographic range
C. deharvengi is known only from the type locality, which is "Malawa, between Maros and Bone-Watampon, Selatan Province, southeastern Sulawesi, Indonesia, at an elevation of about 500 m" (1,640 ft).

Habitat

Description
The genus Cyclotyphlops differs from all other genera in the subfamily Asiatyphlopinae by the arrangement of the head scales. There is a large central circular head shield, from which smaller scales radiate. C. deharvengi is dark brown dorsally, and brown ventrally.

Reproduction
C. deharvengi is oviparous.

References

Further reading
Bosch HAJ in den, Ineich I (1994). "The Typhlopidae of Sulawesi (Indonesia): A Review with Description of a new Genus and a New Species (Serpentes: Typhlopidae)". Journal of Herpetology 28 (2): 206-217. (Cyclotyphlops, new genus; Cyclotyphlops deharvengi, new species).

External links

Typhlopidae
Monotypic reptile genera
Endemic fauna of Indonesia
Reptiles of Sulawesi